The following highways are numbered 979:

United States